Kondapalli Raja is a 1993 Indian Telugu-language action drama film directed by Ravi Raja Pinisetty and produced by K. V. V. Satyanarayana under Saudhamini Creations. It stars Venkatesh, Nagma and Suman, with music composed by M. M. Keeravani. The film is a remake of the 1987 Hindi movie Khudgarz which in turn was based on Jeffrey Archer's 1979 novel Kane and Abel. This is the second Telugu remake of Khudgarz after Prana Snehithulu (1988). The film was a Super Hit at the box office.

Plot
Raja and Ashok have been best friends since childhood. Raja is a milkman while Ashok is the son of a rich businessman and hotelier Gangadharam. When Ashok falls in love with Shanthi, a poor girl, his father is against the wedding, Raja holds the wedding and earns his ire. Meanwhile, Raja falls in love with Subbu/Subbalakshmi, whom he subsequently marries.

Gangadharam, plotting to divide his son and Raja, hints that he would like to build a hotel on Raja's land, he gives the land to Ashok without even accepting money for it. When Gangadharam later talks about bringing down his house, he slaps Gangadharam in anger and even Ashok slaps Raja which breaks up their friendship. Gangadharam orders Raja's house to be bulldozed, which angers Raja and he blames Ashok. Raja boasts that he will become a bigger and more successful hotelier than Ashok. Raja, with his hard work and honesty, becomes the biggest businessman in the city.

Ashok's younger brother Srikanth and Raja's younger sister Kamala study in the same college, Srikanth traps Kamala and marries her to take revenge against Raja; he often harasses her. Meanwhile, during an auction, Raja tricks Ashok to buy a plot for 12 crores, which was not worth more than 3 crores, Raja buys out the entire property Ashok including his house. But with goodness in heart and the old friendship in mind, Raja gives back the property to Ashok.

Meanwhile, Ashok becomes aware of the tricks played by his father by his cousin Prabhakar. Meanwhile, Daniel, common enemy of Raja and Ashok, joins with Gangadharam. Both of them plan to kill Raja by mixing poison in his milk factory; information is passed to Ashok by Kamala, that's why she is tortured by Srikanth and Gangadharam, Raja saves her and discovers their plan to put poison in the milk. At the same time, Ashok goes to stop Daniel, but he is injured, Raja saves him, both of them join and see the end of Daniel and Gangadharam, which changes Srikanth and their friendship resumes.

Cast

Venkatesh as Raja
Suman as Ashok
Nagma as Subbalakshmi
Srikanth as Srikanth
Kota Srinivasa Rao as Gangadharam
Captain Raju as Daniel
Ali as Hotel Server
Sujatha as Raja's mother
Vinod as Prabhakar
Yuvarani as Kamala
Sudhakar as Muddu Krishna 
Costumes Krishna as Minister Simhadri Appanna
Rekha as Shanthi
Narsing Yadav as Rowdy
Archana Puran Singh
Master Raghavendra as young Raja

Soundtrack

Music composed by M. M. Keeravani. Music released on Surya Audio.

Production
Actress Divya Bharti was offered the female role. But she insisted on the director to cast Nagma as she was already busy with her film Tholi Muddu.

References

External links

1993 films
Films scored by M. M. Keeravani
1990s Telugu-language films
Films based on British novels
Films directed by Ravi Raja Pinisetty
Indian buddy films
Films about friendship
Indian action drama films
Telugu remakes of Hindi films